Victor Kusi Boateng (born September 7, 1971) is a Ghanaian theologian, philanthropist, motivational speaker. He is the founder of Power Chapel Worldwide, headquartered in Kumasi, Ghana. He has spoken internationally at various conferences and churches.

Personal life 
Victor Kusi Boateng was born on September 7, 1971, ,in the Ashanti Region of Ghana. He is married to Anita, his wife, and they have four children.

He started the Power Chapel Worldwide in Kumasi with the help of his spiritual father, Archbishop Nicholas Duncan Williams in the Ashanti Region of Ghana.

Victor Kusi Boateng currently serves as the Head Pastor of the Power Chapel Ministries and has been awarded for his work in various fields. He was awarded the Africa Legendary Awards, and in February 2018, he was listed as the 9th most influential pastor on social media.

He currently serves as the Secretary of the Board of Trustees of the ongoing National Cathedral Project in Ghana.

Philanthropist
Boateng along with his VKB ministries, has over the years donated to orphanages and other institutions.

Publications 
Boateng has published several books, including:
Blood for blood
Wisdom Capsules for Survival
Manasseh before Ephraim

References

External links

Living people
Ghanaian Christians
1971 births
Ghanaian theologians
People from Kumasi